Maieco Domingos Henrique António, commonly known as Rasca, (born 10 July 1982) is an Angola international football player.

Rasca plays club football for FC Cabinda. He made his debut for the Angola national football team in a friendly against Mexico in May 2010. He was also called up for 2012 African Cup of Nations qualifier against Uganda in August 2010.

References

External links

1982 births
Living people
Angolan footballers
Angola international footballers
F.C. Bravos do Maquis players
C.R.D. Libolo players
Porcelana FC players
S.L. Benfica (Luanda) players
Girabola players

Association football forwards